Nyceryx is a genus of moths in the family Sphingidae. The genus was erected by Jean Baptiste Boisduval in 1875.

Species
Nyceryx alophus (Boisduval, 1875)
Nyceryx brevis Becker, 2001
Nyceryx coffaeae (Walker, 1856)
Nyceryx continua (Walker, 1856)
Nyceryx draudti Gehlen, 1926
Nyceryx ericea (H. Druce, 1888)
Nyceryx eximia Rothschild & Jordan, 1916
Nyceryx fernandezi Haxaire & Cadiou, 1999
Nyceryx furtadoi Haxaire, 1996
Nyceryx hyposticta (R. Felder, 1874)
Nyceryx janzeni Haxaire, 2005
Nyceryx lunaris Jordan, 1912
Nyceryx magna (R. Felder, 1874)
Nyceryx maxwelli (Rothschild, 1896)
Nyceryx mielkei Haxaire, 2009
Nyceryx nephus (Boisduval, 1875)
Nyceryx nictitans (Boisduval, 1875)
Nyceryx riscus (Schaus, 1890)
Nyceryx stuarti (Rothschild, 1894)
Nyceryx tacita (H. Druce, 1888)
Nephele vau (Walker, 1856)
Nephele xylina Rothschild & Jordan, 1910

Gallery

References

 
Dilophonotini
Moth genera
Taxa named by Jean Baptiste Boisduval